Traveling Companion is a 1996 Italian drama film directed by Peter Del Monte. It was screened in the Un Certain Regard section at the 1996 Cannes Film Festival. For her performance Asia Argento won the 1997 David di Donatello for Best Actress.

Cast
 Asia Argento - Cora
 Michel Piccoli - Cosimo Giusti
 Lino Capolicchio - Pepe
 Silvia Cohen - Ada
 Max Malatesta - Giulio
 Sebastiano Colla - Fabio 
 Germano Di Mattia - Raul 
 Silvana Gasparini - Daria (girl of the pottery workshop)
 Maddalena Maggi - Cora's mother
 Patrizia Pezza - Waitress friend of Cora
 Pier Francesco Poggi - Furniture salesman (as Pierfrancesco Poggi)
 Elisabetta Rocchetti - Beautician friend
 Teresa Saponangelo - Woman in the room (as Maria Teresa Saponangelo) 
 Chantal Ughi - Porter of hotel

References

External links

1996 films
Italian drama road movies
1990s Italian-language films
1990s drama road movies
Films directed by Peter Del Monte
Films shot in Rome
Films about Alzheimer's disease
1996 drama films
1990s Italian films